The JUSCANZ Group is an informal, information-sharing coalition of like-minded countries at the United Nations Human Rights Council and other United Nations bodies, such as the Third, Fourth Committees and the United Nations Conference on Trade and Development. In the United Nations Regional Grouping system, it is considered as a subsection of the Western European and Others Group (WEOG), as most of its members are members of that Group. Its aim is to counterbalance the sway of the European Union bloc in WEOG matters.

The name of the group is derived from the acronym of its founding members Japan, the United States, Canada, Australia and New Zealand.

Role 
The Group's role is mainly to act as a tool for information-sharing at the United Nations. Unlike the United Nations Regional Groups, JUSCANZ is not a policy-coordination mechanism.

Members of the Group are not expected to reach consensus positions on issues. Rather, at JUSCANZ meetings, members meet to share information on the status of resolutions and to flag potential problems or issues for other delegations.

Members 

While membership of the group is not fixed, and its membership has varied throughout its history, the main members that have partaken in meetings of the Group include:

Potential members

History 
On 22 January 2010, Israel was permitted to join the Group for sessions at the United Nations Office at Geneva, but not at the United Nations Headquarters in New York, nor at the other two major office sites of Vienna and Nairobi.

On 11 February 2014, following intense lobbying, Israel was allowed to join the Group in all relevant United Nations Committees at Headquarters in New York.

See also
CANZUK
JACKSNNZ
 Umbrella Group
 Western European and Others Group

References

United Nations coalitions and unofficial groups
Anglosphere
Andorra and the United Nations
Australia and the United Nations
Canada and the United Nations
Iceland and the United Nations
Israel and the United Nations
Japan and the United Nations
Liechtenstein and the United Nations
Monaco and the United Nations
New Zealand and the United Nations
Norway and the United Nations
Switzerland and the United Nations
United States and the United Nations